The Gerrit Smith Estate is a historic residential estate at Oxbow Road and Peterboro Road in Peterboro, New York.  It was home to Gerrit Smith (1797-1874), a 19th-century social reformer, abolitionist, and presidential candidate, and his wife, Ann Carroll Fitzhugh.  Smith established an early temperance hotel on his estate, and it was a widely known stop for escaped slaves on the Underground Railroad.  The surviving elements of the estate were declared a National Historic Landmark in 2001.  The estate is now managed by a nonprofit organization, and is open for tours from June to August.

Description and history
The estate was, in its heyday, a virtual village unto itself, with as many as 30 buildings, including the mansion house, secondary residences, and a hotel. The property is today much reduced: its Federal period mansion was destroyed by fire in the 1930s, the hotel had a short-lived existence (1827-1859) before it was torn down on Gerrit Smith's orders, and numerous other outbuildings have also been demolished or lost to decay.

The building was dew ribed as follows in 1875:

The principal surviving buildings of historical significance that remain are the Peterboro Land Office with an attached smokehouse, designated on the National Register of Historic Places on its own, a 19th-century barn, and an adjacent building that was probably the laundry.

The estate was established by Peter Smith, one of Madison County's early white settlers, in the early 19th century.  Smith acquired a large tract of land from the Oneida people, with whom he had previously engaged in the fur trade.  From this estate, he managed vast holdings of real estate (over  all over the state), and lent his name to both the hamlet of Peterboro and the encompassing township of Smithfield.  Smith's son Gerrit took over this business in 1819, and eventually applied the family wealth to a wide variety of progressive causes.  Principal among these were the abolition of slavery and the temperance movement.  Smith attempted unsuccessfully to make Peterboro a dry community, opening what is believed to be the first temperance hotel in the nation on the estate.  The hotel was ultimately a failure, and Smith razed it in the late 1850s.  The estate was also widely known as a safe haven for escaped slaves making the trek to Canada on the Underground Railroad, and was a meeting place for suffragist organizations.

See also
List of Underground Railroad sites
List of National Historic Landmarks in New York
National Register of Historic Places listings in Madison County, New York

References

External links

Gerrit Smith Estate - official site
Gerrit Smith Estate and Land Office site on "Aboard the Underground Railroad", National Park Service tour list
Description of the Estate
Historic Peterboro

Houses on the National Register of Historic Places in New York (state)
Houses in Madison County, New York
National Historic Landmarks in New York (state)
Museums in Madison County, New York
History museums in New York (state)
Houses on the Underground Railroad
National Register of Historic Places in Madison County, New York
Abolitionism in the United States
Peterboro, New York
Gerrit Smith
Underground Railroad in New York (state)